ERRC may refer to:

 European Roma Rights Centre
 FIA E-Rally Regularity Cup
 Expendability, Recoverability, Repairability Category as defined in AFMCI 23-101 of the United States Air Force